Alexandar Lazov (born 9 July 1990) is a former professional Bulgarian tennis player. On 29 June 2015, he reached his highest ATP singles ranking of 324 whilst his best doubles ranking was 314 on 23 October 2017. In September 2012 he defeated Tihomir Grozdanov to become the 2012 Men's Bulgarian Champion.

Year-end rankings

Challenger and Futures Finals

Singles: 23 (10–13)

Doubles: 29 (10–19)

Davis Cup 
Alexandar Lazov debuted for the Bulgaria Davis Cup team in 2013. Since then he has 9 nominations with 13 ties played, his singles W/L record is 5–8 and doubles W/L record is 3–1 (8–9 overall).

Singles (5–8)

Doubles (3–1) 

RPO = Relegation Play–off
PPO = Promotion Play–off

References

External links
 
 
 

Bulgarian male tennis players
1990 births
Living people
Sportspeople from Pazardzhik
21st-century Bulgarian people